Isaac Uche (born 10 April 1981) is a Nigerian sprinter.

He won the gold medal with the Nigerian 4 x 100 metres relay team at the 2007 All-Africa Games. In 60 metres he finished sixth at the 2008 World Indoor Championships.

His personal best time over 60 m is 6.62 seconds, achieved in February 2008 in Chemnitz.

External links

1981 births
Living people
Nigerian male sprinters
African Games gold medalists for Nigeria
African Games medalists in athletics (track and field)
Athletes (track and field) at the 2007 All-Africa Games
21st-century Nigerian people